Lakelands is a community in the Canadian province of Nova Scotia, located in the Municipal District of East Hants

Lakelands is provided Fire protection services by the Uniacke & District Fire Department, located approximately five kilometres away, in Mount Uniacke. It is a volunteer Fire Service, its members are well trained and equipped. Full policing services are provided to Lakelands by a Royal Canadian Mounted Police (RCMP) detachment, located in Windsor, NS, approximately 10 kilometres west of Lakelands on Highway One.  Primary  to grade nine schooling is provided by the Uniacke District School located in Mount Uniacke, NS. It presently (2012) has a student body of approximately 440 students.  High School service (grade 10 to 12) is provided students by Avon View High School located in Windsor.  It presently has a student body of approximately 900 students (2012).  The Town of Windsor, NS, is also home to King's - Edgehill School.  A private school, founded in 1788, it is the oldest Independent School outside of the United Kingdom.  Situated on a 65-acre campus King's - Edgehill provides both boarding and day schooling services.  It offers a Junior School program for grades seven to nine and a Senior School for grades 10 to 12.  Additionally it also offers an International Baccalaureate Program.  It has been announced that a major development (1000+ acres) has been approved for land encompassing Cameron Lake between Adosise (West Hants) and Lakelands (East Hants).  The development (Forest Lake Country Club) is to include a Nicklaus-designed 18 hole golf course, villas, townhouses, condominiums and amenities.  This project has been approved by the West Hants authorities and is predicted to take 15 to 20 years to complete all phases, including an interchange linking it to Highway 101. The positive economic impact on Lakelands and the surrounding area is expected to be substantial if the project is successful.

References
 Lakelands on Destination Nova Scotia

Communities in Hants County, Nova Scotia
General Service Areas in Nova Scotia